Eriogonum coloradense is a species of flowering plant in the buckwheat family known by the common name Colorado buckwheat. It is endemic to Colorado in the United States.

This species is a mat-forming herb growing just a few centimeters tall. The leaves are located around the base of the plant. They are up to 4 or 5 centimeters long and are mostly green on top with woolly undersides. The inflorescences are borne atop flowering stems reaching up to about 10 centimeters tall. The inflorescence is a cluster of tiny white to pink flowers. This species is most closely related to Eriogonum lonchophyllum, and some authors, including Eriogonum expert James Reveal, suspect it may be a form of that species.

Most of the occurrences of this Colorado endemic plant are located in the vicinity of the Maroon Bells–Snowmass Wilderness. It has a "broad ecological range", occurring in many types of habitat. It occurs on a variety of soils, flat or sloping terrain, every aspect, and a number of landforms. It occurs in several plant communities and at a range of elevations. Considering its ability to live in a range of environmental conditions it is unclear why the plant is not more common.

The main threat to this species is recreational activity in its mountain habitat. It occurs at popular recreational sites near Crested Butte.

References

External links

coloradense
Flora of Colorado